Ibrahim Garab-Yare was the first deputy minister of finance of Khatumo State from 2012 to 2014.

See also
Politics of Somalia

References

Somalian politicians
Living people
Year of birth missing (living people)